Walter Leckrone (June 2, 1897 – November 24, 1964) was an American newspaper editor. He was also an American football and college basketball coach.

Ashland College
Leckron served as the head football coach (1920) and head men's basketball coach at Ashland University in Ashland, Ohio.

News career
Leckrone worked as a newspaper editor at several outlets in the Midwest. Those included The Toledo News-Bee (1936–1938), the Cleveland Press (1938–1942), and the Indianapolis Times (1942–1960).

References

1897 births
1964 deaths
20th-century American newspaper editors
Ashland University alumni
Basketball coaches from Ohio
Ashland Eagles football coaches
Ashland Eagles men's basketball coaches
Editors of Indiana newspapers
Editors of Ohio newspapers
People from Perry County, Ohio
Players of American football from Ohio